George Thomas Allen  (23 August 185220 April 1940) was a senior Australian public servant, one of the inaugural heads of departments in the Australian Public Service at Australia's federation.

Life and career
George Allen was born on 23 August 1852 in Geelong, Victoria. He was educated at Flinders Street School.

Between 1901 and his retirement in 1916, Allen was the Secretary of the Department of the Treasury. In his first two years in the role, Allen only had 20 staff.

Allen died, never married, in his home in Kew, Melbourne, on 20 April 1940.

Awards
In January 1913, Allen was made a Companion of the Order of St Michael and St George, while Secretary of the Australian Government Treasury.

References

1852 births
1940 deaths
Australian Companions of the Order of St Michael and St George
Australian Companions of the Imperial Service Order
Secretaries of the Department of the Treasury of Australia
People from Geelong